Tanalt is a Berber village located in the province of Chtouka-Aït Baha, Southern Morocco.

Populated places in Chtouka Aït Baha Province
Rural communes of Souss-Massa